In tennis, an ace is a legal serve that is not touched by the receiver, winning the point for the server. In professional tennis, aces are generally seen on a player's first serve, where the server can strike the ball with maximum force and take more chances with ball placement, such as the far corners of the service box. According to the International Tennis Hall of Fame, this term was coined by the sports journalist Allison Danzig.

Professional singles records 

Aces have been officially recorded by the top-level professional tennis circuits since 1991, so these records start at that time.

Only main draw singles matches are included here.

FRef

ATP Tour

John Isner has the most aces in a tournament with 214 during the 2018 Wimbledon, and he has the most in a single match with 113 during his 11-hour encounter with Nicolas Mahut in 2010. John Isner has served the most aces with 13,782.

Ivo Karlović has the most in a best-of-three-set match with 45 at Halle in 2015. Two weeks later, during Wimbledon, he became the only player to hit at least 40 aces in three consecutive matches.

Goran Ivanišević has the most in a single season with 1,477 in 1996. He also has the second most in a tournament with 213 when he won the 2001 Wimbledon title.

Roger Federer hit 50 aces in the 2009 Wimbledon final, the record for a Grand Slam final. He is also third on the career list.

Aces

Top 10 most aces served in a match

Most aces in a US Open match

Most aces in a clay-court tournament 
* Note: This marked the third time that Isner had hit 100+ aces in a clay-court tournament.

Most aces in a one-week tournament

Most aces served in a three-set match

Most combined aces in a three-set match

Most consecutive aces

Serving five consecutive aces from 0–40 down

Most aces without a double fault

WTA Tour

Serena Williams holds the record for most aces in a tournament with 102 en route to winning the 2012 Wimbledon title.

Karolína Plíšková has the most aces in a single season with 530 in 2016, which broke her own record of 517 in 2015. She has also served the most aces in a match on clay, with 21 in her second round victory over Jeļena Ostapenko at Stuttgart in 2021.

Most aces in a match
There have been 32 matches played in which a player has served 20 or more aces, since 2008.

Seasons with 500+ aces

Half-ace 
In 1999, the Swedish artist and writer Kjell Höglund proposed a term for when an opponent manages to hit the ball without it actually entering into play. He suggested it should be called a "half-ace".

See also

 ATP Tour records
 Fastest recorded tennis serves

References

Tennis terminology
Tennis records and statistics